The IEEE MTT-S International Microwave Symposium (IMS) is an annual technical professional conference specializing in RF/Microwave theory and applications that is a combination of multiple technical conferences and a commercial exhibition.  The IMS is the largest gathering of RF/Microwave professionals in the world (7,300 to 12,000 total attendance in recent years) and is organized and sponsored by the IEEE Microwave Theory and Techniques Society (MTT-S).

IMS (also called "Microwave Week" or "MTT Show") has annually occurred since 1957  in various locations in North America (and Hawaii in 2007 and. 2017).  The event evolved from the annual meeting of the MTT-S (originally called PGMTT).

In addition to the IMS activities, IMS hosts the IEEE RFIC Symposium and the summer Automated RF Techniques Group (ARFTG) Conference.   The combination of these events lead to over 1,000 technical presentations in the form of technical podium sessions, poster sessions, workshops and panels for 2,500 technical program attendees.

IMS has included a commercial exhibition ("trade show") since 1972. Typically, varying on site and the state of the industry’s economy, the exhibit space runs greater than 150K sq ft, 800+ 10x10 booth equivalents displaying the wares  and services of 500+ exhibitors from around the world.

The IMS is organized by a local MTT-S volunteer steering committee with the help of a professional event manager and a professional exhibition manager.

Related Conferences 
   European Microwave Week (EuMW)
   Asia-Pacific Microwave Conference (APMC)
   SBMO/IEEE MTT-S International Microwave and Optoelectronics Conference (IMOC)
   Radio and Wireless Week (RWW)
   IEEE International Wireless Symposium (IWS)
   IEEE International Microwave and RF Conference (IMaRC)

References

External links 
 IEEE 
 IEEE MTT Society

International Microwave Symposium
Trade shows in the United States
Technology conferences
International conferences in the United States